Wynona is an incorporated town in central Osage County, Oklahoma, United States. It was founded by a local Osage-Cherokee rancher, Antoine Rogers, in 1903. The population was 437 at the 2010 census, a 17.7 percent decline from 531 in 2000.

History
An Osage-Cherokee rancher, Antoine Rogers, settled in the area that would become the town of Wynona in 1871, after the Osage tribe had been removed from Kansas to Indian Territory by the U. S. Government. In 1903, the Missouri, Kansas and Texas Railway (also known as the MK&T or Katy railroad) built a line across Rogers's land. A store was built adjacent to the track, and that event is considered the establishment of Wynona, which soon became a cattle shipping point.

The Osage Townsite Company began development of the town in 1909. By the end of the year, the population had grown from 20 to over 150 residents. The first local newspaper, a weekly named the Wynona Enterprise,  appeared in August 1909.

Oil was discovered near Wynona in 1914, and led to the creation of Wynona Oil and Gas Company. This caused an influx of new residents to support the local oil industry. Wynona's 1920 census reported 2,749 inhabitants. Wynona remained important for its agriculture and ranching business. Ranchers diversified into producing hogs, poultry and dairy products. However, the town failed to put in electric service and paved streets, causing some businessmen to move elsewhere. The end of the boom in Osage County oil production and the onset of the Great Depression caused the population to decline sharply to 1,171 in 1930 and to 652 in 1960. The MK&T abandoned its rail  line in 1977.

On March 22, 1946, the town was struck by a violent tornado, estimated by tornado expert Thomas P. Grazulis to have been F4 intensity on the Fujita scale. Damage was estimated at $150,000 (1946 USD).

Geography
Wynona is located at  (36.545583, -96.325962).

Demographics

As of the census of 2000, there were 531 people, 221 households, and 150 families residing in the town. There were 246 housing units at an average density of 455.2 per square mile (175.9/km2). The racial makeup of the town was 76.65% White, 14.69% Native American, 0.56% from other races, and 8.10% from two or more races. Hispanic or Latino of any race were 2.82% of the population.

There were 221 households, out of which 29.4% had children under the age of 18 living with them, 52.9% were married couples living together, 10.4% had a female householder with no husband present, and 32.1% were non-families. 28.5% of all households were made up of individuals, and 12.7% had someone living alone who was 65 years of age or older. The average household size was 2.40 and the average family size was 2.96.

In the town, the population was spread out, with 25.0% under the age of 18, 8.9% from 18 to 24, 26.2% from 25 to 44, 25.6% from 45 to 64, and 14.3% who were 65 years of age or older. The median age was 36 years. For every 100 females, there were 105.8 males. For every 100 females age 18 and over, there were 98.0 males.

The median income for a household in the town was $24,917, and the median income for a family was $32,500. Males had a median income of $23,750 versus $16,932 for females. The per capita income for the town was $14,201. About 9.6% of families and 14.4% of the population were below the poverty line, including 25.7% of those under age 18 and 6.5% of those age 65 or over.

Government
Wynona is governed by a town board.

Notes

References

External links
 Wynona Public Schools

Towns in Osage County, Oklahoma
Towns in Oklahoma